The Couffo or Kouffo is a river of West Africa. It rises in Togo but runs for much of its 125-kilometer course through Benin, draining into Lake Ahémé. It forms part of the Togo–Benin border and also serves as the border between Kouffo and Zou Departments.

See also
List of rivers of Africa

References

Rivers of Benin
Rivers of Togo